Altufyevo may refer to:

Altufyevsky District, also known as Altufyevo District, in Moscow, Russia
Altufyevo Estate in northern Moscow
Altufyevo (Metro), a Moscow Metro station